Charles Benedict Davenport (June 1, 1866 – February 18, 1944) was a biologist and eugenicist  influential in the American eugenics movement.

Early life and education
Davenport was born in Stamford, Connecticut, to Amzi Benedict Davenport, an abolitionist of Puritan ancestry, and his wife Jane Joralemon Dimon (of English, Dutch and Italian ancestry). His father had eleven children by two wives, and Charles grew up with his family on Garden Place in Brooklyn Heights. His mother's strong beliefs tended to rub off onto Charles and he followed the example of his mother. During the summer months, Charles and his family spent their time on a family farm near Stamford.

Due to Davenport's father's strong belief in Protestantism, as a young boy Charles was tutored at home. This came about in order for Charles to learn the values of hard work and education. When he was not studying, Charles worked as a janitor and errand boy for his father's business. His father had a significant influence on his early career, as he encouraged Charles to become an engineer. However, this was not his primary interest, and after working for a few years to save up money, Charles enrolled in Harvard College to pursue his genuine interest of becoming a scientist. He graduated with a Bachelor's after two years, and earned a Ph.D in biology in 1892. He married Gertrude Crotty, a zoology graduate of Harvard, in 1894. He had two daughters with Gertrude, Millia Crotty Davenport and Jane Davenport Harris di Tomasi.

Career
Later on, Davenport became a professor of zoology at Harvard. He became one of the most prominent American biologists of his time, pioneering new quantitative standards of taxonomy. Davenport had a tremendous respect for the biometric approach to evolution pioneered by Francis Galton and Karl Pearson, and was involved in Pearson's journal, Biometrika. However, after the re-discovery of Gregor Mendel's laws of heredity, he moved on to become a prominent supporter of Mendelian inheritance.

From 1899 to 1904 Davenport worked in Chicago. He was curator of the Zoological Museum of the University of Chicago from 1901 to 1904.

In 1904, Davenport became director of Cold Spring Harbor Laboratory, where he founded the Eugenics Record Office in 1910. During his time at Cold Spring Harbor Laboratory, Davenport began a series of investigations into aspects of the inheritance of human personality and mental traits, and over the years he generated hundreds of papers and several books on the genetics of alcoholism, pellagra (later shown to be due to a vitamin deficiency), criminality, feeblemindedness, seafaringness, bad temper, intelligence, manic depression, and the biological effects of race crossing. Additionally, Davenport mentored many people while working at the Laboratory, such as Massachusetts suffragist, Claiborne Catlin Elliman. Before Charles Davenport came across eugenics, he studied math. He came to know these subjects through Professors Karl Pearson and gentleman amateur Francis Galton. He met them in London. Upon meeting them, he fell in love with the subject matter. In 1901, Biometrika, a journal of which Charles Davenport was a co editor, gave him the opportunity to use the skills that he had learned. Davenport became an advocate of the biometrical approach for the rest of his life. He began to study human heredity, and much of his effort was later turned to promoting eugenics. His 1911 book, Heredity in Relation to Eugenics, was used as a college textbook for many years. The year after it was published Davenport was elected to the National Academy of Sciences. Davenport's work with eugenics caused much controversy among many other eugenicists and scientists. Although his writings were about eugenics, their findings were very simplistic and out of touch with the findings from genetics. This caused much racial and class bias. Only his most ardent admirers regarded it as truly scientific work. During Davenport's tenure at Cold Spring Harbor, several reorganizations took place there. In 1918 the Carnegie Institution of Washington took over funding of the ERO with an additional handsome endowment from Mary Harriman. Davenport was elected to the American Philosophical Society in 1907. In 1921 he was elected as a Fellow of the American Statistical Association.

Davenport founded the International Federation of Eugenics Organizations (IFEO) in 1925, with Eugen Fischer as chairman of the Commission on Bastardization and Miscegenation (1927). Davenport aspired to found a World Institute for Miscegenations, and "was working on a 'world map' of the 'mixed-race areas, which he introduced for the first time at a meeting of the IFEO in Munich in 1928."

Together with his assistant Morris Steggerda, Davenport attempted to develop a comprehensive quantitative approach to human miscegenation. The results of their research was presented in the book Race Crossing in Jamaica (1929), which attempted to provide statistical evidence for biological and cultural degradation following interbreeding between white and black populations. Today it is considered a work of scientific racism, and was criticized in its time for drawing conclusions which stretched far beyond (and sometimes counter to) the data it presented. Particularly caustic was the review of the book published by Karl Pearson at Nature, where he considered that "the only thing that is apparent in the whole of this lengthy treatise is that the samples are too small and drawn from too heterogeneous a population to provide any trustworthy conclusions at all". The entire eugenics movement was criticized for being supposedly based on racist and classist assumptions set out to prove the unfitness of wide sections of the American population which Davenport and his followers considered "degenerate", using methods criticized even by British eugenicists as unscientific. In 1907 and 1910 Charles Davenport and his wife wrote four essays that pertained to human hereditary genes. These essays included hair color, eye color, and skin pigmentation. These essays helped pave the way for eugenics to be taught in class. Many of the topics and discussions belonged to Dr. and Mrs. Charles Davenport but the information for one essay in particular came from friends of theirs involved in the same topic. Many problems occurred when they started to use other information. As Davenport and other eugenicist professors and experts began to and continued to study more in-depth eugenics, they had to start to come up with original ideas so as not to conflict with past ideas.

Influence on immigration policy in the United States 
Another way Charles Davenport's work manifested in the public sphere is regarding the topic of immigration. He believed that race determined behavior, and that many mental and behavioral traits were hereditary. He drew these conclusions by studying family pedigrees, and was criticized by some of his peers for making unfounded conclusions. Regardless, Davenport believed that the biological differences between the races justified a strict immigration policy, and that people of races deemed “undesirable” should not be allowed into the country. His support of Mendelian genetics fueled this belief, as he believed allowing certain groups of people to enter the country would negatively impact the nation's genetic pool. Domestically, he also supported the prevention of "negative eugenics" through sterilization and sexual segregation of people who were considered genetically inferior. Sharing the racist views of many scientists during this time, those that Davenport considered to be genetically inferior included Black people and Southeastern Europeans.

In addition to supporting these beliefs through his scientific work, he was actively involved in lobbying members of Congress. Charles Davenport spoke regularly with Congressman Albert Johnson, who was a cosponsor of the Immigration Act of 1924, and encouraged him to restrict immigration in that legislation. Davenport was not alone in this effort to influence policy, as Harry Laughlin, the superintendent of the Eugenics Record Office, appeared before Congress on multiple occasions to promote strict immigration laws and the belief that immigration was a "biological problem". In all, Davenport’s efforts served to provide scientific justification to social policies he supported, and immigration was one way this manifested in the beginning of the 20th century.

End of career and impact 
After Adolf Hitler's rise to power in Germany, Davenport maintained connections with various Nazi institutions and publications, both before and during World War II. He held editorial positions at two influential German journals, both of which were founded in 1935, and in 1939 he wrote a contribution to the Festschrift for Otto Reche, who became an important figure in the plan to "remove" those populations considered "inferior" in eastern Germany. In a 1938 Letter to the Editor of Life magazine, he included both Franklin Roosevelt and Joseph Goebbels as examples of crippled statesmen who, motivated by their physical defects, have "led revolutions and aspired to dictatorships while burdening their country with heavy taxes and reducing its finances to chaos."

Although many other scientists had stopped supporting eugenics due to the rise of Nazism in Germany, Charles Davenport remained a fervent supporter until the end of his life. Six years after he retired in 1934, Davenport held firm to these beliefs even after the Carnegie Institute pulled funding from the eugenics program at Cold Spring Harbor in 1940. While Charles Davenport is remembered primarily for his role in the eugenics movement, he also had a significant influence in increasing funding for genetics research. His success in organizing the financial support for scientific endeavors fueled his success throughout his career, while also allowing for the study of other scientists. Indeed, Cold Spring Harbor saw many prominent geneticists go through its doors while he was its director. He died of pneumonia in 1944 at the age of 77. He is buried in Laurel Hollow, New York.

Eugenics creed
As quoted in the National Academy of Sciences' "Biographical Memoir of Charles Benedict Davenport" by Oscar Riddle, Davenport's Eugenics creed was as follows:
 "I believe in striving to raise the human race to the highest plane of social organization, of cooperative work and of effective endeavor."
 "I believe that I am the trustee of the germ plasm that I carry; that this has been passed on to me through thousands of generations before me; and that I betray the trust if (that germ plasm being good) I so act as to jeopardize it, with its excellent possibilities, or, from motives of personal convenience, to unduly limit offspring."
 "I believe that, having made our choice in marriage carefully, we, the married pair, should seek to have 4 to 6 children in order that our carefully selected germ plasm shall be reproduced in adequate degree and that this preferred stock shall not be swamped by that less carefully selected."
 "I believe in such a selection of immigrants as shall not tend to adulterate our national germ plasm with socially unfit traits."
 "I believe in repressing my instincts when to follow them would injure the next generation."

References

Further reading
 
 Edwin Black, War Against the Weak: Eugenics and America's Campaign to Create a Master Race, (New York / London: Four Walls Eight Windows, 2003)
 Elof Axel Carlson, "Times of triumph, Times of Doubt, science and the battle for the public trust", (Cold Spring Harbor; Cold Spring Harbor Press, 2006)

External links

 
 
 "Biographical Memoir of Charles Benedict Davenport" by Oscar Riddle via this page on the website of the National Academy of Sciences (NAS)
 A Science Odyssey: People and Discoveries: Charles Davenport at www.pbs.org
 International Eugenics

Davenport, Charles Benedict
Davenport, Charles Benedict
Harvard College alumni
American science writers
Davenport, Charles Benedict
Fellows of the American Statistical Association
Members of the United States National Academy of Sciences
Deaths from pneumonia in New York (state)
19th-century American writers
20th-century American non-fiction writers
American biologists
People from Brooklyn Heights